The Staatsgalerie Stuttgart ("State Gallery") is an art museum in Stuttgart, Germany, it opened in 1843. In 1984, the opening of the Neue Staatsgalerie (New State Gallery) designed by James Stirling transformed the once provincial gallery into one of Europe's leading museums.

Alte Staatsgalerie

Originally, the classicist building of the Alte Staatsgalerie was also the home of the Royal Art School. The building was built in 1843. After being severely damaged in World War II, it was rebuilt in 1945-1947 and reopened in 1948.

It houses the following collections:
 Old German paintings 1300-1550
 Italian paintings 1300-1800
 Dutch paintings 1500-1700
 German paintings of the baroque period
 Art from 1800-1900 (romanticism, impressionism)

Neue Staatsgalerie

The Neue Staatsgalerie, a controversial architectural design by James Stirling, opened on March 9, 1984 on a site right next to the old building. It houses a collection of 20th-century modern art — from Pablo Picasso to Oskar Schlemmer, Joan Miró and Joseph Beuys. The building layout bears resemblance to Schinkel's Altes Museum, with a series of connected galleries around three sides of a central rotunda. However, the front of the museum is not as symmetrical as the Altes Museum and the traditional configuration is slanted with the entrance set at an angle.

Notable works in collection
Annibale Carracci's Corpse of Christ (1583–1585)
Max Beckmann's Journey on the Fish
Salvador Dalí's The Raised Instant (1938)
Otto Dix's The Match Seller (1920)
George Grosz's The Funeral (1918)
Franz Marc's The Small Yellow Horses (1912)
Henri Matisse's With the Toilet (La Hair-style) (1907)
Joan Miró's The Bird with the Calm View, the Wings in Flames (1952)
Piet Mondrian's Composition in White, Red and Blue (1936)
Pablo Picasso's Tumblers (Mother and Son) (1905), Laufende Frauen am Strand (1922), The Breakfast in the Free One (1961)
Barnett Newman's Who's Afraid of Red, Yellow and Blue II (1967)
Works by: Paul Klee, Marc Chagall, Wassily Kandinsky, Willi Baumeister, Gerhard Richter
In 2013, the Staatsgalerie returned Virgin and Child, a 15th-century painting attributed to the Master of Flémalle (1375–1444), to the estate of Max Stern, a German-born Jewish dealer who fled the Nazis and later operated the Dominion Gallery in Montreal.

See also
Max Silberberg

References

External links
 

Museums in Stuttgart
Art museums and galleries in Baden-Württemberg
Postmodern architecture
Art museums established in 1843
1843 establishments in Germany
19th-century establishments in Württemberg